Libor Kašík (born 31 March 1992) is a Czech professional ice hockey goaltender who currently playing for HK Nitra in the Slovak Extraliga

Career
He is a champion of 2013–14 Czech Extraliga with HC Zlín.

References

External links
 

1992 births
Living people
Czech ice hockey goaltenders
PSG Berani Zlín players
Sportspeople from Zlín
HK Nitra players
Czech expatriate ice hockey players in Slovakia
Czech expatriate ice hockey players in Russia
Czech expatriate ice hockey players in Finland